Sandringham Hotel may refer to a number of establishments:

 Sandringham Hotel, Newtown, Sydney, New South Wales, Australia
 Sandringham Hotel, Hunstanton, England